The YF-100 is a Chinese liquid rocket engine burning LOX and kerosene in an oxidizer-rich staged combustion cycle.

Development of the engine began in the 2000s, along with its sibling, the smaller YF-115, which would power the LM-6 and LM-7 upper stages. Testing was directed by the China National Space Administration (CNSA) commencing in 2005. Development works are mainly carried out by the Xi'an Aerospace Propulsion Institute. The engine had its first 300 seconds test fire in November 2007.

A high efficiency/high thrust environmentally-friendly rocket engine was always an objective within Programme 863 in the 1980s; however, Chinese industry was not mature enough at that time to produce such a rocket until they obtained RD-120 in early 1990 from Russia following the collapse of the USSR.
It is the first Chinese rocket engine to adopt the staged-combustion cycle and the most powerful to date. During July 2012 the engine fired for 200 seconds generating  of thrust. On May 28, 2012, the National Defense Science and Industry Bureau certified the engine.

The engine is designed for use on the first stage of the Chinese government's new generation of launch vehicles, the Long March 5, the Long March 6 and the Long March 7. The engine's maiden flight, on the Long March 6, took place on September 20, 2015.

Technical Description
The YF-100 is a pump-fed oxidizer rich staged combustion rocket engine. It has adjustable thrust and variable mixture ratio. Its preburner burns all the LOX mass flow with a bit of kerosene to generate hot gas that powers the single turbine. The turbopump is a single-shaft design, with a single-stage oxygen pump and a dual-stage kerosene pump driven by the same turbine. It also has two low-pressure pumps that prevent cavitation. This arrangement is very similar to the RD-170 design. The engine has a heat exchanger to heat oxygen gas for LOX tank pressurization, and also supplies high-pressure kerosene as hydraulic fluid for the thrust vector control actuators.

The development required ten years of research, requiring the mastering of 70 key technologies, the development of 50 new materials, and the construction of 61 sets of engines with a combined total of more than 40,000 seconds of ignition time by 2013.

Versions
At least three different versions are known to exist.
 YF-100 (single-axis TVC): Version for the LM-5 and LM-7 boosters. This version of TVC has a single axis of gimbal.
 YF-100 (dual-axis TVC): Version for the LM-7 core. This version TVC has a dual-axis gimbal.
 YF-100GBI: A version used on the LM-6. Due to the rocket's single nozzle, a dual-axis gimbal can not control the rocket's roll. Therefore, this version of the engine diverts a portion of the preburner exhaust through two roll control nozzles on opposite sides of the launch vehicle at the expense of losing 0.30% of thrust and 0.79% of isp while the O/F is increased by 0.12%.
 YF-100K: Version used for the crewed Long March 10.

See also
LM-5 – Rocket family that uses the YF-100.
LM-6 – Rocket family that uses the YF-100.
LM-7 – Rocket family that uses the YF-100.
YF-115 – Upper stage Chinese rocket engine based on the YF-100 technology.
RD-120 – Soviet rocket engine.
RD-801 – Ukrainian rocket engine with very similar characteristics.

References

External links 
 The Ship Knowledge, issue 11, 2012 (舰船知识2012年第11期)

Rocket engines of China
Rocket engines using kerosene propellant
Rocket engines using the staged combustion cycle